Somrot Kamsing (born 1971-09-24) is a retired male boxer from Thailand, who competed for his Asian country at the 1996 Summer Olympics. An older brother of Somluck Kamsing, he was defeated in Atlanta, Georgia in the quarterfinals of the men's light flyweight division (– 48 kg) by Bulgaria's eventual gold medalist Daniel Petrov.

In Muay thai his name is Pimaran Sitharan.

References
 sports-reference

1971 births
Living people
Flyweight boxers
Boxers at the 1996 Summer Olympics
Somrot Kamsing
Somrot Kamsing
Somrot Kamsing
Southeast Asian Games medalists in boxing
Somrot Kamsing
Competitors at the 1995 Southeast Asian Games
Somrot Kamsing
Somrot Kamsing